Kirk Preston Watson (born March 18, 1958) is an American attorney and politician currently serving as the Mayor of Austin, Texas. A member of the Democratic Party, he served a previous term as Mayor of Austin from 1997 to 2001. He ran unsuccessfully for Texas Attorney General in the 2002 election, when he was defeated by Republican Greg Abbott, later governor of Texas. In 2006, Watson was elected to the Texas Senate from District 14.

In 2011, Watson was chosen by his Democratic colleagues to chair the Senate Democratic Caucus and served until 2015. On the first day of the 86th Legislature, he was chosen by his colleagues—Democrats and Republicans—to serve as president pro tempore. The position typically goes to the most senior member, regardless of party, who has not yet served as President Pro Tem, and is second in line of succession to the Governor.

It was announced by the Austin American-Statesman that Watson planned to resign from the Texas State Senate to become the first dean of the University of Houston's Hobby School of Public Affairs. His resignation was effective April 30, 2020. He was re-elected in the 2022 Austin mayoral election to become Mayor of Austin for the second time.

Early life and education
Watson was born in Oklahoma City and raised in Saginaw, Texas, a suburb of Fort Worth, where he attended Boswell High School. He received a bachelor's degree in political science in 1980 and a Juris Doctor in 1981 from Baylor University in Waco, Texas. At Baylor Law School, Watson was editor-in-chief of the Baylor Law Review and graduated first in his class. He subsequently clerked for the U.S. Court of Appeals for the Fifth Circuit.

Early political career 
Watson was elected president of the Texas Young Lawyers Association in 1990 and served on the executive committee of the State Bar of Texas. Watson was an active Democrat throughout the 1990s and served as the chairman of the Travis County Democratic Party.

In 1991, Watson was appointed by Governor Ann Richards to serve as chairman of the Texas Air Control Board, the state agency that was charged with protecting air quality in Texas.  During his tenure, he worked to merge the agency with the Texas Air Control Board and the Texas Water Commission to form the Texas Natural Resources Conservation Commission, and oversaw implementation of the 1991 amendments to the federal Clean Air Act.

In 1994, he was named the Outstanding Young Lawyer of Texas. In 1997, Watson co-founded the Austin law firm of Watson Bishop London & Galow, creating a broad law practice that represented families, doctors, small businesses, and some of the state's major universities.

First Term as Mayor of Austin (1997–2001) 
In 1997, after Watson moved from Rollingwood to Austin, he was elected mayor of Austin, a nonpartisan position. He ran on a pledge to build consensus in a city that was then dominated by political battles between environmentalists and developers. He campaigned to raise more than $78 million for land preservation and $300 million for transportation improvements. Watson's signature accomplishments as mayor included the transformation of Downtown Austin into a "24-hour downtown" by encouraging development of housing and retail in place of vacant warehouses and parking lots, partially through tax incentives and the city's Smart Growth initiatives.

In 1999, Watson spearheaded a redevelopment project along several blocks of waterfront property in Downtown Austin, in an effort to create a new public-private "digital district" in place of dilapidated warehouses and businesses including the former Liberty Lunch, which were demolished. Watson, along with architect Larry Speck, courted the Computer Sciences Corporation (CSC) by offering a $10.4 million tax incentive to anchor two office buildings on the site in lieu of building their planned campus in a watershed, and under the condition that CSC foot the bill for a new city hall building. The first two buildings were constructed and are now part of the Second Street District, while CSC vacated the premises before following through with the construction of the present-day Austin City Hall.

In 2000, Watson spearheaded a $15.1 million tax incentive for Intel to build a new headquarters in Downtown Austin; Intel stopped construction and the unfinished building was demolished in 2007 and replaced by the Austin United States Courthouse.

In 2000, Watson was reelected with 84% of the vote – the highest percentage a mayoral candidate has ever received in Austin. In November 2001, he stepped down to run unsuccessfully for Texas Attorney General in the 2002 election, losing to 41% to 57% to now-Governor Greg Abbott. In 2005, he served as chairman of the Greater Austin Chamber of Commerce.

Texas Senate (2007–2020) 

Watson was elected to the Texas Senate in November 2006, succeeding Senator Gonzalo Barrientos. He received more than 80 percent of the vote. Watson was unopposed in the March 2006 Democratic Primary.

He served as vice-chairman of the Senate Transportation and Homeland Security committee, as well as on the Senate Business and Commerce, Economic Development, Jurisprudence, and Nominations committees.  In 2008, he was appointed as one of two senators to the state Business Tax Advisory Committee.

Watson has become a prominent voice on transportation, clean energy, and higher education issues, and he has campaigned to widen transparency in the state's finances and increase health coverage for Texans, particularly children.  In 2009, he led the fight against a budget rider that would have effectively banned embryonic stem cell research at Texas universities.  The rider ultimately was not adopted.

Watson served on many committees including the Capital Area Metropolitan Planning Organization (CAMPO), of which he is the former Transportation Policy Board Chairman.  CAMPO is federally designated as the primary transportation planning organization in Central Texas.

The July 2007 Texas Monthly magazine recognized Watson as "Rookie of the Year" for the 2007 session of the Texas Legislature.  In 2009, the magazine named him one of the state's 10 Best Legislators.  He also was given the Price Daniel Award for Distinguished Public Service by the Baylor Alumni Association, and the Excellence in Leadership Award by Concordia University, Texas.

Watson considered running in the 2010 race for governor, but in August 2009 decided to instead seek re-election to the Texas Senate.

In June 2013, Watson moved to overturn a ruling designed to end the filibuster of Senator Wendy Davis. Together, their efforts averted the passage of SB5, a bill that its opponents claimed would enact severe abortion restrictions in Texas. Instead, in a second special session the same bill was passed (96 to 49) by the Texas House, and then (19 to 11) by the Texas Senate, and then signed into law by Gov. Perry less than a month later. State Rep. Charles "Doc" Anderson of Waco (Texas HD 56) told reporters following the Davis filibuster that the additional special session might "cost taxpayers more than $800,000." Another news organization estimated special-session costs at roughly $30,000 per day.

In the general election on November 6, 2018, Watson easily won reelection, 274,122 (74.1 percent) to 96,355 (25.3 percent) for his Republican opponent, George W. Hindman. A Libertarian Party candidate, Micah M. Verlander, held another 10,838 votes (2.8 percent).

In 2019, Watson proposed a series of money-raising maneuvers to fund the lane expansion project along I-35 through Austin, including doubling the state gas tax, raising vehicle registration fees in Travis County, enacting a special sales tax, and issuing bonds.

Watson resigned from the Texas State Senate on April 30, 2020 to become the first dean of the University of Houston's Hobby School of Public Affairs. Watson resigned from the University of Houston after less than 1 year to become a candidate for Mayor.

Controversies

Texas highways
Much of Watson's first year in office was spent mediating a long, very bitter dispute on the CAMPO board over highway improvements in the Austin area. While many of the improvements had been in transportation plans for years, they had never been constructed. A lack of transportation funding, affecting projects across Texas, had led previous boards to support plans that would toll the additional capacity as well as nearly completed projects, sparking intense opposition throughout the region.

Upon being elected chairman by the rest of the board in January 2007, Watson led the effort to keep the controversial projects in the region's transportation plan.  He then spearheaded a public effort to create a process that would allow policy makers and the public to analyze the need for transportation projects, mechanisms to pay for them, and potential public benefits from them.

On October 8, 2007, the CAMPO board overwhelmingly approved a plan to add new toll lanes to several existing highways (U.S. Highway 290, U.S. Highway 183, and State Highway 71).

Most of the improvements were approved on a 15-4 vote, and none were opposed by more than five board members.  The board was heckled with shouts of "Political suicide!" and catcalls.

2008 Chris Matthews interview

Following Senator Barack Obama's victory in the 2008 Wisconsin Democratic Primary Election on February 19, 2008, Watson appeared via live feed on MSNBC's election night coverage as a supporter of Senator Obama, whom Watson had endorsed. During the interview, Chris Matthews asked Watson to name one of Senator Obama's legislative accomplishments. A five second delay from the live feed caused confusion amongst Chris Matthews and Kirk Watson. After Watson was unable to list one of Obama's accomplishments, Matthews responded, "You've supported him for president, you're on national television, name his legislative accomplishments, Barack Obama's, sir." After Watson was excused, Matthews commented, "He [Watson] is here to defend Barack Obama and he had nothing to say; that's a problem."

Second Term as Mayor of Austin (2023-)

Election

Watson declared his candidacy for the 2022 mayoral election. In the November 8 general election, he advanced to a runoff election against Celia Israel. On December 13, 2022, Watson won the runoff election with 57,346 votes (50.39%) to his opponent Israel's 56,460 votes (49.61%).

Tenure
Shortly after beginning his second term as mayor of Austin, Kirk Watson faced significant criticism for his handling of and communications about long-term power outages in the city after a record-breaking ice storm on February 1, 2023 resulted in tens of thousands of city residents going without electricity for up to 12 days.

In February 2023, Watson led an effort to terminate City Manager Spencer Cronk, who was fired in a 10-1 vote by City Council. The decision came following the city's response to the winter storm, as well as Cronk's decision to announce a four-year contract with the Austin Police Association — against the wishes of City Council to vote on a one-year contract amid negotiations. The council appointed Jesús Garza — a previous city manager during Watson’s previous tenure as mayor, and manager of the Stand Together Austin political action committee that supported Watson's mayoral campaign.

Electoral history

2018

2014

2012

2010

2006

2002

2000

1997

A majority is usually required to win a mayoral election in Austin, and if no candidate receives more than 50 percent in the general election, a winner is usually determined in a runoff election. However, on May 5, 1997, two days after the general election, candidate Ronney Reynolds, a two-term council member, withdrew from the runoff resulting in Watson's election as mayor.

Personal life 
Watson is married to Elizabeth Anne "Liz" McDaniel and is the father of Preston McDaniel and Cooper Kyle Watson.

Notes

External links
Texas Senator Kirk Watson official website
The Senate of Texas - Senator Kirk Watson official government website
Project Vote Smart - Kirk Watson profile
Follow the Money - Kirk Watson
2006 2004 2002 campaign contributions

|-

|-

|-

1958 births
21st-century American politicians
Baylor Law School alumni
Democratic Party Texas state senators
Lawyers from Oklahoma City
Living people
Mayors of Austin, Texas
People from Austin, Texas
Politicians from Oklahoma City
Presidents pro tempore of the Texas Senate
Texas lawyers